Agustín Edwards Mac-Clure (June 17, 1878 – June 18, 1941)  was a Chilean lawyer, diplomat and businessman, and founder of the Santiago edition of El Mercurio newspaper.

Early life
Agustín Edwards was born in Santiago, the son of Agustín Edwards Ross and of Luisa McClure Ossandón.

Career
In 1900 he founded the Santiago edition of El Mercurio newspaper, using the same name of the newspaper he inherited from his father and that was published in Valparaíso. He also wrote and published some history books: My Native Land, published in English; El Alba and Cuatro Presidentes de Chile, that refer to the administrations of presidents Prieto, Bulnes, Montt and Pérez. In May 1941, shortly before his death, he authored the foreword of Trout Fishing in Chilean Rivers.

He was a member of the lower house of the Chilean National Congress for four consecutive periods, between 1900 and 1910, representing the Partido Nacional. He was also Minister of Foreign Affairs, Cult and Colonization during the presidency of Germán Riesco, and again during the presidency of Pedro Montt, under whom he was also named Interior Minister. In 1910 he was named a plenipotentiary to Great Britain, and had a very important participation in the negotiations with Peru, with respect to the plebiscite that was to solve the question of the property of Tacna and Arica.

He was elected president of the General Assembly of the League of Nations from 1922 until 1923.

As executor of the will of businessman and philanthropist Federico Santa María Carrera, he founded Federico Santa María Technical University.

Additional information

See also
María Edwards Mac Clure
Edwards family
El Mercurio

Notes

External links 

1878 births
1941 deaths
A
Presidents of the Assembly of the League of Nations
Members of the Chamber of Deputies of Chile
Chilean Ministers of the Interior
Foreign ministers of Chile
Ambassadors of Chile to the United Kingdom
Chilean diplomats
Chilean businesspeople
Chilean newspaper editors
Chilean journalists
Male journalists
People from Santiago
Chilean people of English descent
Chilean people of Scottish descent
Chilean people of Welsh descent
Maria Moors Cabot Prize winners
Candidates for President of Chile